Sin on Saturday was a British live, late-night chat show based on the theme of the seven deadly sins. It was produced by BBC Scotland, but it was pulled from the schedules after only three broadcasts. Originally, the show was to broadcast eight episodes. The first seven were to be based on each of the deadly sins, and the eighth one intended to round off the series by talking about being caught sinning.

The show was hosted by Bernard Falk and also featured comedy sketches and musical interludes. It included a memorable appearance by the actor Oliver Reed who interrupted an interview with a nun on the edition entitled 'Lust', which also featured porn actress Linda Lovelace.

In 1992 the show was featured on a 'TV Hell' theme night broadcast on BBC2.

Cast
Bernard Falk – Host
Robbie Coltrane
Elaine Loudon
Rod Natkiel – Director

Episode List

Episode 1. Lust – Aired 7 August 1982
Episode 2. Covetousness – Aired 14 August 1982
Episode 3. Envy – Aired 21 August 1982

At the end of the third episode, it was announced that the fourth episode was to be on gluttony. However it never aired.

References

External links
 
'The Independent' article – by Mark Lawson

BBC Television shows
BBC television talk shows
1982 British television series debuts
1982 British television series endings
1980s British television talk shows
English-language television shows
Seven deadly sins in popular culture